Jeffrey Lynn Sydner (born November 11, 1969) is a former American football wide receiver in the National Football League who played for the Philadelphia Eagles and New York Jets. He played college football for the Hawaii Warriors.

References

1969 births
Living people
American football wide receivers
American football return specialists
American football running backs
Philadelphia Eagles players
New York Jets players
Hawaii Rainbow Warriors football players